Pavlovka is an urban locality (a work settlement) and the administrative center of Pavlovsky District of Ulyanovsk Oblast, Russia. Population: 

Its history began in 1695 when lands in this area were granted to migrants from Penza. The settlement was called Izbalyk (after the Izbalyk River) or Dmitriyevskoye. In the second half of the 19th century, its name changed to Pavlovka. Urban-type settlement status was granted to it in 1978.

References

Urban-type settlements in Ulyanovsk Oblast
Populated places established in 1695
1695 establishments in Russia
Khvalynsky Uyezd